Sir Henry Harpur, 5th Baronet (24 June 1708 – 7 June 1748) was an English baronet and politician.

He was the oldest son of Sir John Harpur, 4th Baronet, of Calke Abbey, and his wife Catherine, daughter of Thomas Crew, 2nd Baron Crew.  He was educated at Brasenose College, Oxford.

Harpur was a Tory Member of Parliament (MP) for Worcester from 1744 to 1747, and for Tamworth from  1747 until his death in 1748, aged 40.

He married Lady Caroline Manners (died 1769), daughter of the Duke of Rutland. He was succeeded in the baronetcy by his second but eldest surviving son Henry (c.1739–1789).

His daughter Caroline married the Scottish MP Adam Hay.  In 1753, his widow, Lady Caroline, married Sir Robert Burdett, 4th Baronet.

References 
 

1708 births
1748 deaths
Baronets in the Baronetage of England
Members of the Parliament of Great Britain for English constituencies
British MPs 1741–1747
British MPs 1747–1754
Alumni of Brasenose College, Oxford
People from South Derbyshire District